Neoxanthops is a genus of crabs in the family Xanthidae, containing the following species:

 Neoxanthops lineatus (A. Milne-Edwards, 1867)
 Neoxanthops quadrilobatus (Sakai, 1939)
 Neoxanthops rotundus Guinot, 1968

References

Xanthoidea